Riverview Hospital may refer to:
 Riverview Hospital (Coquitlam), a mental health facility in Coquitlam, British Columbia
 Riverview Hospital (Red Bank), a hospital in Monmouth County, New Jersey
 Riverview Hospital (Noblesville), in Noblesville, Indiana
 Riverview Psychiatric Center, in Augusta, Maine

See also
Riverview (disambiguation)